Anggun Nugroho (born 28 August 1982) is a badminton player from Indonesia. Nugroho competed in badminton at the 2004 Summer Olympics in mixed doubles with partner Eny Widiowati. He now works as Indonesian national badminton coach.

Achievements

Asian Championships 
Mixed doubles

Southeast Asian Games 
Mixed doubles

BWF Grand Prix 
The BWF Grand Prix has two levels, the Grand Prix and Grand Prix Gold. It is a series of badminton tournaments sanctioned by the Badminton World Federation (BWF) since 2007. The World Badminton Grand Prix sanctioned by International Badminton Federation (IBF) since 1983.

Mixed doubles

 BWF Grand Prix Gold tournament
 BWF & IBF Grand Prix tournament

IBF International
Mixed doubles

References

External links 
 
 

1982 births
Living people
People from Banyumas Regency
Sportspeople from Central Java
Indonesian male badminton players
Badminton players at the 2004 Summer Olympics
Olympic badminton players of Indonesia
Competitors at the 2003 Southeast Asian Games
Competitors at the 2005 Southeast Asian Games
Southeast Asian Games gold medalists for Indonesia
Southeast Asian Games silver medalists for Indonesia
Southeast Asian Games medalists in badminton
21st-century Indonesian people